The rue Joubert is a street in the 9th arrondissement of Paris, France. 

It is named after General Barthélemy Catherine Joubert, who was fatally wounded at the Battle of Novi in 1799.

At n°20, (junction with rue de la Victoire) is a mansion of the French architect François-Joseph Bélanger, which for his wife Mademoiselle Dervieux, a dancer, he rebuilt in Pompeiian style after his release from the Saint-Lazare jail during the French Revolution.

References
 Histoire de Paris rue par rue, maison par maison, Charles Lefeuve, 1875 (http://www.paris-pittoresque.com/rues/315.htm)

Streets in the 9th arrondissement of Paris